Benjamin Hickox (also Benjamin Hickcox) (1686 – November 17, 1745) was a member of the Connecticut House of Representatives from Norwalk, Connecticut Colony in the session of May 1728.

He was the son of Samuel Hickox, and Hannah Upton.

He operated a gristmill which was located behind the present site of the Congregational Church in 
Wilton where there is a waterfall over the Comstock Brook (the Falls Branch of the Norwalk River). The mill served as a gathering place where local residents organized their efforts for status as a parish. He was the first deacon of the Congregational Church in Wilton.

References 

Members of the Connecticut House of Representatives
Politicians from Norwalk, Connecticut
Deacons
Millers
People from Wilton, Connecticut
1686 births
1745 deaths